Den Hollander is a surname. Notable people with the surname include:

 Jane den Hollander, Australian academic administrator
 Frank den Hollander (born 1956), Dutch mathematician
 Roy Den Hollander (1948–2020), American lawyer and men's right activist

See also
 Hollander